Druzhba is a rural locality (a selo) and the administrative center of Druzhbinsky Selsoviet, Aleysky District, Altai Krai, Russia. The population was 1,068 as of 2013. There are 21 streets.

Geography 
Druzhba is located 25 km northwest of Aleysk (the district's administrative centre) by road. Mokhovskoye is the nearest rural locality.

References 

Rural localities in Aleysky District